The Church of the Holy Ghost in Crowcombe, Somerset, England has a tower dating from the 14th century with the rest of the building being dated at the 15th century. It has been designated by Historic England as a Grade I listed building.

There was a previous church on the site, possible dating from the Saxon era. The north chapel is known as the Carew Chapel and was used by the lords of the manor who lived in the nearby Crowcombe Court.

In 1724 the spire was damaged by a lightning strike. The top section of the spire was removed and is now planted in the churchyard and stone from the spire was used in the flooring of the church. Inside the church carved bench-ends, dating from 1534, depict such pagan subjects as the Green Man and the legend of the men of Crowcombe fighting a two-headed dragon.

In the churchyard is a medieval cross. It has been scheduled as an ancient monument.

The parish is part of the Quantock Towers benefice within the Quantock deanery.

Opposite the church is the Church House and Pound which was built around 1515 for parish functions. It is a Grade II* listed building and was refurbished in 2007.

See also

 Grade I listed buildings in West Somerset
 List of Somerset towers
 List of ecclesiastical parishes in the Diocese of Bath and Wells

References

15th-century church buildings in England
Towers completed in the 14th century
Church of England church buildings in West Somerset
Grade I listed churches in Somerset
Grade I listed buildings in West Somerset